Paraplatax is an extinct genus of prehistoric bony fish that lived during the early Oligocene epoch.

See also

 Prehistoric fish
 List of prehistoric bony fish

References

Prehistoric perciform genera
Oligocene fish